Megachile sicula is a species of bee in the family Megachilidae. It was described by Rossi in 1792.

References

External links

Sicula
Insects described in 1792
Taxa named by Pietro Rossi